The 1997 Auto Trader RAC British Touring Car Championship was won by Alain Menu of the Williams Renault Dealer Racing team, driving a Renault Laguna. Menu dominated the year, setting a record of 12 wins during the season. The runner up was Frank Biela of Audi Sport UK in an Audi A4 Quattro. Third place was Menu's teammate, Jason Plato. In the independent class the championship was won by Robb Gravett in a Honda Accord.

Season Review 1997
 
Defending manufacturers champions Audi retained the same driver line up for 1997, with defending drivers champion Frank Biela again partnering John Bintcliffe. Pre-season was not without controversy for Audi as had been announced that due to their dominance of much of 1996, a further weight penalty would be applied to both of their A4 Quattro's, a penalty that would subsequently be relaxed by 30kg at Oulton Park. Biela would secure 5 victories during the season to finish runner up to eventual champion Menu although he was never a serious threat for the title such was the Renault drivers dominance. Bintcliffe again finished 7th overall, scoring his first victory at Knockhill, repeating the feat at Thruxton.

Williams Renault, now into their third season running the Laguna, had a new driver in the form of future double BTCC champion Jason Plato, replacing 1991 Champion Will Hoy. Plato would drive alongside Swiss ace Alain Menu, three times a runner-up in the BTCC and now into his fifth year with Renault. Plato made history by taking pole position in his first 3 races but it was Menu who would go on to dominate the season with 12 victories, leading the standings throughout and wrapping up the title at Snetterton with 6 races to go. Plato's first victory came in that Snetterton race, the second coming in the final race of the year at Silverstone. The team wrapped up the manufacturers and teams championships.

The TWR backed Volvo squad, after an ultimately disappointing 1996 despite 5 wins, introduced a new car for 1997, replacing the 850 model with the sleek new S40. Swede Rickard Rydell, again drove alongside former Ford driver Kelvin Burt. The sole victory came for Rydell at Brands Hatch in August whilst Kelvin Burt scored just one podium in the opening race of the year 

Honda, now having their pair of Accords run by the Prodrive team, had arguably the most exciting driver line-up for '97. Hard charger James Thompson, having joined from Vauxhall, and 1994 BTCC champion/ex-F1 driver Gabriele Tarquini would drive for the Japanese marque, who had had a resurgence towards the back end of 1996. Ultimately the season was a disappointment with just a single victory for each driver.

After a limited effort in 1996 Nissan re-entered the championship with a full blown manufacturer backed team. RML, who had run Vauxhall's effort since 1994, fielded a pair of brand new Primeras for David Leslie and Anthony Reid, the latter making his debut in the championship. Reliability was an issue but 5 podium finishes hinted at what was to come in 1998.

Vauxhall, after a difficult 1996 with just a solitary win for James Thompson, replaced the outgoing Yorkshireman with Derek Warwick, who joined both as a driver and team manager of the new-look Triple Eight Vectras after a somewhat low-key first BTCC season with Alfa in 1995. Double champion John Cleland would drive for Vauxhall for the ninth straight year in the BTCC. The team started the season with 1996 cars re-engineered by Triple Eight before being replaced by the new cars at Knockhill. The car suffered after a miscalculation with the aerodynamics that meant it lacked down force and did not work its tyres hard enough. BTCC rules meant that unlike in STW this was unable to be rectified.

Ford elected to introduce the latest shape Mondeo, and the driver line-up looked formidable on paper, with 1991 champion Will Hoy joining twice winner of the Touring Car World Cup New Zealander Paul Radisich. The cars were again built by Reynard Motorsport and run by West Surrey Racing. Whilst results were better than 1996 the cars continued to suffer from poor reliability and Ford finished the season 7th in the manufacturer standings.

After two seasons running the Honda factory effort Motorsport Developments (MSD) joined forces with Peugeot, now into their second season running the 406. They maintained the experienced duo of Patrick Watts and 1992 champion Tim Harvey and proved to be significantly more competitive than the previous season with Harvey taking a pair of 2nd places in wet conditions at Thruxton and Donington.

The independents championship was one of the most keenly contested for years. Defending independents champion Lee Brookes switched from a Toyota to a Peugeot, whilst rookie Jamie Wall drove the Mint Motorsport Vauxhall Cavalier used by Richard Kaye in 1996.

Matt Neal would again enter in his Team Dynamics built  Mondeo, however the team looking to have closer ties to a manufacturer switched to a Nissan Primera mid season. Neal won the class six times, as many as eventual champion Gravett and was often mixing it with the works cars however inconsistency meant he was never in the championship battle.

1990 Champion Robb Gravett, having run selected rounds in 1996, returned with a Honda  entered by Graham Hathaway and went on to secure the title, Whilst Scot Colin Gallie ran a 1994 BMW 318i entered by Dave Cook. Ian Heward again entered his 1993 ex RML Vauxhall Cavalier but often failed to qualify. Swedish Touring Car Championship regular Jan Brunstedt entered the early rounds at Silverstone but was lapped in both races.

Tourist Trophy 
On October 18/19 the 1997 Tourist Trophy took place at Donington Park featuring an all-new format. One qualifying session on Saturday set the grid for the first of two 20-lap qualifying heats with the grid for the second race a reverse of the first. The grid for the 25 lap final was then decided by each driver's aggregate performance in the two heats.

Entry List

RAC Tourist Trophy

Calendar 
All races were held in the United Kingdom.

1Qualifying cancelled. Grids set by championship standings.
2Qualifying cancelled. Grid set by fastest times in Sunday warm-up.
3Qualifying cancelled. Grid set by fastest laps in race 1.

Championships Results

Drivers Championship

Note: bold signifies pole position (1 point awarded all races), italics signifies fastest lap.Drivers top 20 results count towards the championship.

Privateers Championship

Manufacturers Championship

Teams Championship

RAC Tourist Trophy Results

References

External links 
 BTCC Pages 
 Touring-Cars.net
 Super Touring Register
 1997 Teams Championship Results

Touring Car Championship
British Touring Car Championship seasons